The 1925 Ladies Open Championships was held at the Queen's Club, West Kensington in London from 1–7 December 1924. Joyce Cave won the title defeating her sister Nancy Cave in the final. This championship was held in the 1924 but in the 1924/25 season so is attributed as being the 1925 event.

Draw and results

Section A (round robin)

Section B (round robin)

Section C (round robin)

Section D (round robin)

Second round

Semi finals

Final

Notes
+ Mrs. Winifred Kittermaster (née Miss Winifred Rotherham) 
Susan Noel was only 12 years old during this tournament.

References

Women's British Open Squash Championships
British Open Squash Championships
Women's British Open Squash Championships
Squash competitions in London
British Open Championships